Paralithodes rathbuni, the spiny king crab, is a species of king crab in the family Lithodidae. It is found in the East Pacific Ocean off California.

References

Further reading

External links

 

Anomura
Articles created by Qbugbot
Crustaceans described in 1895